Matheus Albino Carneiro (born 4 February 1995) is a Brazilian professional footballer who plays for Botafogo as a goalkeeper in the Série B and Campeonato Paulista.

Club career 
On 1 September 2020, Albino signed a two-year contract with Zira FK. On 27 May 2021, Zira announced that Albino had left the club.

References

External links

Association football goalkeepers
Brazilian expatriate footballers
Azerbaijan Premier League players
Joinville Esporte Clube players
Londrina Esporte Clube players
Zira FK players
Expatriate footballers in Azerbaijan
Brazilian expatriate sportspeople in Azerbaijan
Living people
1995 births
Footballers from Rio de Janeiro (city)
Brazilian footballers